Syed Waseem Hussain (born 11 April 1972) is a Pakistani politician who had been a member of the National Assembly of Pakistan, from June 2013 to May 2018.

Early life
He was born on 11 April 1972.

Political career

He was elected to the National Assembly of Pakistan as a candidate of Muttahida Qaumi Movement (MQM) from Constituency NA-220 (Hyderabad-II) in 2013 Pakistani general election. He received 135,886 votes and defeated Abul khair Mohammad Zubair, a candidate of Jamiat Ulema-e-Pakistan (Noorani).

In March 2018, he quit MQM and joined Pak Sarzameen Party.

References

1972 births
Living people
Muhajir people
Pakistani MNAs 2013–2018
People from Sindh
Muttahida Qaumi Movement MNAs